Anne Johnstone may refer to:

Anne Graham Johnstone, artist
Anne Johnstone (badminton), see List of Irish International champions in badminton and Scottish National Badminton Championships
Ann Johnstone Heaphy from 2007 Birthday Honours

See also
Anne Johnston (disambiguation)